The women's 57 kg  competition in taekwondo at the 2004 Summer Olympics in Athens took place on August 27 at the Faliro Coastal Zone Olympic Complex.

South Korea's Jang Ji-Won outwitted her American counterpart Nia Abdallah to strike the women's featherweight title in the final with a default score of 2–1. Mexican fighter and three-time World silver medalist Iridia Salazar defied her odds to add a bronze to her career list, leading 2–1 over Spain's Sonia Reyes in the repechage.

Competition format
The main bracket consisted of a single elimination tournament, culminating in the gold medal match. The taekwondo fighters eliminated in earlier rounds by the two finalists of the main bracket advanced directly to the repechage tournament. These matches determined the bronze medal winner for the event.

Schedule
All times are Greece Standard Time (UTC+2)

Results
Legend
PTG — Won by points gap
KO — Won by knockout
SUP — Won by superiority
OT — Won on over time (Golden Point)
WO — Walkover

Main bracket

Repechage

References

External links
Official Report

Women's 057 kg
Olymp
Women's events at the 2004 Summer Olympics